Yorck is a 1931 German war film directed by Gustav Ucicky and starring Werner Krauss, Grete Mosheim and Rudolf Forster. It portrays the life of the Prussian General Ludwig Yorck von Wartenburg, particularly his refusal to serve in Napoleon's army during the French Invasion of Russia in 1812. It was a Prussian film, one of a cycle of films made during the era that focused on Prussian history.

The film's sets were designed by the art director Robert Herlth and Walter Röhrig. It was shot at the Babelsberg Studios in Potsdam and on location around Berlin.

Main cast
 Werner Krauss as General Yorck von Wartenberg 
 Grete Mosheim as Barbara 
 Rudolf Forster as King Friedrich Wilhelm III of Prussia
 Gustaf Gründgens as Karl August Fürst von Hardenberg
 Lothar Müthel as General von Clausewitz
 Friedrich Kayßler as General Kleist von Nollendorf
 Raoul Aslan as General McDonald 
 Hans Rehmann as Lt. Rüdiger Heyking 
 Walter Janssen as Vicomte Noailles 
 Günther Hadank as Florian von Seydlitz
 Theodor Loos as Roeder 
 Paul Otto as Natzmer 
 Otto Wallburg as  Field Marshal Count Diebitsch-Sabalkanskij
 Jakob Tiedtke as Krause

References

Bibliography
 Noack, Frank. Veit Harlan: The Life and Work of a Nazi Filmmaker. University Press of Kentucky, 2016.

External links

Yorck at Virtual History

1931 films
1930s biographical films
1930s historical films
1931 war films
German biographical films
German historical films
German war films
Films of the Weimar Republic
1930s German-language films
Films directed by Gustav Ucicky
Films set in 1812
Napoleonic Wars films
Films shot at Babelsberg Studios
Prussian films
UFA GmbH films
German black-and-white films
1930s German films